The Chico River, is a river system in the Philippines in the island of Luzon, encompassing the regions of Cordillera and Cagayan Valley.

The most extensive river in the Cordillera region, it covers the provinces of Mountain Province, Kalinga and Cagayan. It is referred to as a "river of life" for the Kalinga people who live on its banks, and is well known among development workers because of the Chico River Dam Project, an electric power generation project which local residents resisted for three decades before it was finally shelved in the 1980s - a landmark case study concerning ancestral domain issues in the Philippines.

Geography

For centuries it has been central to farming, trading, livelihoods, and daily life, whether as a benefit or hindrance. It provided a source of water for washing and irrigation, and habitat for carabao who had to be led to a watering hole daily. At times it might be an obstacle to settlements on the other side of the river, but until the last century this was an opportunity for enterprising Filipinos who would provide ferry transport. Now, bridges suitable for vehicles have been built. The danger of flooding was less frequent due to being at a higher elevation than the bigger, flood-prone Cagayan into which it feeds.

Source and course

The highest headwaters begin along the slopes of Mount Data in the Cordillera mountains at Bauko, Mountain Province. It then flows northeastward through and next to cities and municipalities including Bontoc, Sabangan, Sadanga, Tinglayan, Lubuagan, Tabuk City, Pinukpuk, Tuao, Piat, Rizal, finally arriving at Santo Niño, where it merges with the Cagayan River.

Its tributaries are the Bunog River to the south, The Tanudan and Biga Rivers to the east, The Mabaca and Saltan Rivers to the North, and the Pasil River further downstream.

References

Rivers of the Philippines
Landforms of Mountain Province
Landforms of Kalinga (province)
Landforms of Cagayan